Cave City can refer to some places in the United States:

 Cave City, Arkansas
 Cave City, California
 Cave City, Kentucky
 Cave City, Missouri